This is a list of notable footballers who have played for Bristol City. The aim is for this list to include all players that have played 100 or more senior matches for the club. Other players who are deemed to have played an important role for the club can be included, but the reason for their notability should be included in the 'Notes' column.

For a list of all Bristol City players with a Wikipedia article, see :Category:Bristol City F.C. players, and for the current squad see Bristol City F.C.#Current squad.

Explanation of List

Players should be listed in chronological order according to the year in which they first played for the club, and then by alphabetical order of their surname. Appearances and goals should include substitute appearances, but exclude wartime matches. Further information on competitions/seasons which are regarded as eligible for appearance stats are provided below, and if a player's data is not available for any of these competitions an appropriate note should be added to the table.

League appearances
League appearances and goals should include data for the following league spells, but should not include play-off matches:
 Southern League: 1897–98 to 1900–01
 Football League: 1901–02 to present

Total appearances
The figures for total appearances and goals should include the League figures together with the following competitions:
 Play-off matches (1987–88, 1996–97, 2002–03, 2003–04, 2007–08)
 FA Cup
 Football League Cup; Football League Trophy (1983–84 to 1989–90, 1995–96 to 1997–98, 1999–2000 to 2006–07); Full Members Cup (1990–91, 1991–92); Anglo-Italian Cup (1992–93, 1993–94); Football League Third Division South Cup (1933–34 to 1938–39)
 Anglo-Scottish Cup (1975–76 to 1980–81), Football League Group Cup/Trophy (1982–83), Watney Cup (1973–74)

List of players

Statistics are up to date as of 22 May 2012.

Notes
Philip Coggins joined Bristol City at the age of 16 from Dorset House Boys club he was signed as a pro at the age of 18 and played for the reserves and 1st team before leaving Bristol city at the age of 20.

References 
 Post-war Football League Player statistics
 Soccerbase stats (use Search for...on left menu and select 'Players' drop down)
 
 Appearances, goals and club years stats at enfa.co.uk Michael Joyce (subscription required)
 
 

Players
 
Bristol City
Bristol City players
Association football player non-biographical articles